Francis Joseph Schenk (April 1, 1901 – October 28, 1969) was an American prelate of the Roman Catholic Church. He served as bishop of the Diocese of Crookston in Minnesota (1945–1960) and bishop of the Diocese of Duluth in Minnesota (1960–1969).

Biography

Early life 
Francis Schenk was born on April 1, 1901, in Superior, Wisconsin, to Nicholas and Frances Mary (née Fischer) Schenk. He attended St. Thomas Academy then in St. Paul, Minnesota, from 1915 to 1918, and earned a Bachelor of Arts degree from the College of St. Thomas in St. Paul in St. Paul in 1922. He then studied for the priesthood at St. Paul Seminary, receiving a Bachelor of Sacred Theology degree in 1926.

Priesthood 
Schenk was ordained a priest for the Archdiocese of St. Paul and Minneapolis on June 13, 1926. He continued his studies at the Catholic University of America in Washington, D.C., where he earned a doctorate in canon law in 1928. Following his return to Minnesota, he served as secretary to Archbishop Austin Dowling from 1928 to 1930. Schenk then served as vice-chancellor of the archdiocese (1930–1934) and as a professor at St. Paul Seminary (1934–1942). From 1942 to 1945, he served as vicar general of the archdiocese and rector of the Cathedral of St. Paul.

Bishop of Crookston 
On March 10, 1945, Schenk was appointed the third bishop of the Diocese of Crookston by Pope Pius XII. He received his episcopal consecration on May 24, 1945, from Archbishop John Murray, with Bishops Thomas Welch and Aloisius Muench serving as co-consecrators. During his tenure in Crookston, Schenk established over 30 new churches, founded Our Northland Diocese newspaper, and organized diocesan offices of the Catholic Social Service Agency and the Catholic Youth Organization. He also founded summer boarding schools for children of the thousands of Mexican migrant workers who worked in the diocese.

Bishop of Duluth 
Following the death of Bishop Welch, Schenk was appointed the fourth bishop of the Diocese of Duluth by Pope John XXIII on January 27, 1960. Between 1962 and 1965, he attended all four sessions of the Second Vatican Council in Rome.

Retirement and legacy 
On April 30, 1969, Pope Paul VI accepted Schenk's resignation as bishop of Duluth.  Francis Schenk died on October 28, 1969, at age 68.

Notes

1901 births
1969 deaths
University of St. Thomas (Minnesota) alumni
Saint Paul Seminary School of Divinity alumni
Catholic University of America alumni
People from Superior, Wisconsin
Roman Catholic Archdiocese of Saint Paul and Minneapolis
Roman Catholic bishops of Duluth
Roman Catholic bishops of Crookston
Participants in the Second Vatican Council
20th-century Roman Catholic bishops in the United States
Religious leaders from Wisconsin
Catholics from Wisconsin